The Archaeological Museum of Amphipolis is a museum in Amphipolis, Central Macedonia, Greece. It is located in the archaeological site of ancient Amphipolis (a city founded in 437 BC), near River Strymon at close range of the Thessaloniki–Kavala national highway and within the walls of the ancient city itself. In the museum, finds from Amphipolis and its surroundings are exhibited. The excavations took place mainly in the period from 1956 to 1984, under the direction of the late archaeologist Dimitris Lazaridis. After his death (1985) his daughter, Calliope Lazaridis, continued the work until 1989. 

There are also finds from ancient Argilos and Eion, the port of ancient Amphipolis, together with wall panels relating the history of ancient Amphipolis and the surrounding area. Also, an 18th-century historians’ correspondence about ancient Amphipolis, along with photographs of the unearthing and restoration of the Lion of Amphipolis, in 1913.

Location

The museum is located about 600 meters north of the acropolis, right at the entrance to the modern village of Amfipoli.

The building

The construction of the museum stretched between 1984 and 1995. It was built in two-storey construction and is divided into several areas. In addition to the exhibition rooms, there are offices, a conference room and a warehouse. On display are finds from the area of ancient Amphipolis and its surroundings; The artefacts were found in sanctuaries, settlements and tombs. The museum contains many items related to the history and civilisation of Amphipolis dating from the Archaic into the Byzantine period. It is well laid out and with labels and information panels.

Arrangement of the finds

Basement

 Prehistoric era
 Early historical period
 Classical and Hellenistic time
 The sanctuaries
 Public and private life
 tombs
 The early Christian period
 The Byzantine period
 Temporary exhibitions

Upper floor

 The history of Amphipolis
 The history of the colonization of the surroundings of Strymon river
 The history of neighboring places like Argilos, Eion and Brea
 The evolution of the Macedonian kingdom and some of its kings

Important finds

 Figures from prehistoric times
 Gold jewelry from the Kasta tomb
 A clay bust of a female deity, found in a tomb from the Hellenistic period
 The stele into which the Ephebic law was carved
 A silver vessel and a golden branch of olive leaves
 A golden wreath (grave offering from the 4th century BC)
 A head of Aphrodite (Roman replica)
 Capital from the Basilica C of Amphipolis
 A gold coin of Justinian (Byzantine epoch 527 to 565 AD)
 Gold coin (stater) of Alexander the Great

The Macedonian coinage

Due to precious metal mines on the peninsula of Halkidiki and the Pangaion Mountains, enough raw materials were available for coinage. In the first half of the 5th century BC Alexander I introduced coinage in the Macedonian Kingdom. By extending his kingdom to the east, Alexander I brought more mines, located in the vicinity of Philippi, under his control.  The yield from these mines alone was estimated at one TalentSilver (about 26 kg) per day. Depending on the sufficient availability of the raw material silver, the coins were either made of pure silver or of a silver alloy mixed with other metals. From the 5th century BC BC, two currencies existed in parallel. Heavier and more valuable coins for foreign trade and smaller, lower value, for payments within Macedonia. Towards the end of the 5th century, the smaller pieces of silver were gradually replaced by bronze coins. Phillip II continued to expand the Macedonian state, gaining control over more mines. In addition to the mint in Pella another was built in Amphipolis. From this time, gold coins were also made to the Attic standard (see Attic talent), which was introduced by Philip II.

Gallery

References

External links
Hellenic Ministry of Culture and Tourism
Museums of Macedonia

Amphipolis
Buildings and structures in Serres (regional unit)